Put ka Suncu (trans. Road to Sun) is the first and only live album by Yugoslav progressive rock band Pop Mašina, released in 1976. Put ka Suncu is the first solo live album by a Yugoslav rock act (as prior to this album only various artists live albums were released).

Recording
The tracks on the album were recorded on three different Pop Mašina performances in Belgrade Sports Hall: "Tražim put" and "Negde daleko" were recorded on the performance held on 2 January 1974, "Sećam se" on the performance held on 4 January 1975, and the title track on the performance held on 29 November 1975.

Track listing

Personnel
Robert Nemeček - bass guitar, vocals, producer
Zoran Božinović - guitar, vocals
Mihajlo Popović - drums

Additional personnel
Aca Radojčić - recording (tracks: 1, 3)
Slobodan Đoršević - recording (track 2)
Voja Antnonić - recording (track 4)
Mitja Hadži-Vuković - recording, mixing, engineer (track 4)
Milan Miletić - engineer (tracks: 1, 2, 3)
Dragan Vukičević - mixing (tracks: 1, 2, 3)
Tahir Durkalić - mixing (tracks: 1, 2, 3)
Jugoslav Vlahović - design

Legacy 
In 2000 the song "Put ka Suncu" polled at 92nd on the Rock Express Top 100 Yugoslav Rock Songs of All Times list.

References

External links 
Put ka Suncu at Discogs

Pop Mašina albums
1976 live albums
ZKP RTLJ live albums